3C 299 is a radio galaxy/quasar located in the constellation Boötes.

References

External links
 www.jb.man.ac.uk/atlas/ (J. P. Leahy)

3C 299
Boötes